The Desert Man is a 1917 silent film Western directed by and starring William S. Hart. It was distributed by Triangle Film Corporation.

A fragment or incomplete print exists.

Cast
 William S. Hart - Jim Alton
 Margery Wilson - Jennie
 Buster Irving - Joey
 Henry Belmar - Razor Joe
 Milton Ross - Tacoma Jake
 Jack Livingston - Dr. Howard
 Walt Whitman - Old Burnss
 Josephine Headley - Katy

References

External links

 
 

1917 films
1917 Western (genre) films
1917 lost films
American black-and-white films
Films directed by William S. Hart
Lost Western (genre) films
Silent American Western (genre) films
1910s American films